Erigeron yukonensis is a rare Arctic species of flowering plant in the family Asteraceae known by the common name Yukon fleabane. It is native to the northwestern corner of North America: Alaska, Yukon, Northwest Territories.

Erigeron yukonensis grows in rocky slopes and meadows, usually above the tree line. It is a branching perennial herb up to 40 centimeters (16 inches) tall, producing a taproot and a woody underground caudex. It generally produces 1-4 flower heads per stem. Each head contains 42–82 pink, purple, or white ray florets surrounding numerous yellow disc florets.

References

yukonensis
Flora of the Arctic
Plants described in 1901
Flora of Alaska
Flora of Yukon
Flora of the Northwest Territories
Flora without expected TNC conservation status